Jay Costa (born November 17, 1957) is an American politician, currently serving as a member of the Pennsylvania State Senate who has represented the 43rd District since 1996. On November 17, 2010, Senate Democrats elected Costa as their new floor leader, succeeding the retiring Bob Mellow.

Education 
Costa attended the Community College of Allegheny County, earning an A.S.degree in Criminology in 1977. He earned a Bachelor of Arts degree from the Indiana University of Pennsylvania where he studied Criminal Justice with the ultimate goal of becoming a police officer, and then earned a Juris Doctor from the Duquesne University School of Law.

Career 
Jay Costa began his career after graduating with a bachelor's degree as a Deputy Sherriff of Allegheny County.

In 2013, Costa’s chief of staff, Tony Lepore, testified under oath that Lepore functioned as a “middle man” in a corruption scheme involving awarding lucrative state contracts. As of February 2021, Lepore is still working for Costa.

He is supportive of abortion rights and received a 100% rating from Planned Parenthood in 2013 and 2014.

In May 2019, it was reported that Costa and State Attorney General Josh Shapiro had directed paid communications staffers to edit their Wikipedia pages with positive material.

December 18, 2020, it was let known Jay Costa's law firm received $7,309,100 in PPP (Covid Related Paycheck Protection Program) loans ranking it 7th in all of Pittsburgh.

Early in his career, Costa sponsored a plan to leverage rebates to lower drug costs for seniors.

In February 21, 2021, it was revealed Jay Costa's son, Anthony, works for lobbying firm Cameron Companies which "lobbies on behalf of some of the state’s largest corporations" including 3M.

In a March 12, 2021, ruling, RE: "Gittins v. Gateway Clipper," the defendant represented by Dickie, McCamey & Chilcote of which Jay Costa is a Principal was fined $67,614 for failing to turn over discovery information.

Costa has served on the board of trustees of the University of Pittsburgh and is treasurer of the Community College of Allegheny County board.

References

External links

Senator Costa official caucus website
Pennsylvania State Senate - Jay Costa official PA Senate website

Follow the Money - Jay Costa
2006 2004 2002 2000 campaign contributions

1957 births
Living people
Politicians from Pittsburgh
2012 United States presidential electors
Democratic Party Pennsylvania state senators
21st-century American politicians
Floor leaders of state legislatures in the United States